Kim Ji-sun (born June 27, 1987) is a South Korean curler from Gyeonggi Province. She was the skip of the 2014 South Korean Olympic Curling Team.

Career
Kim was a member of the silver medal-winning Korean team that won a silver medal at the 2007 Pacific Junior Curling Championships. She was the team's alternate and played two matches. She was also the alternate for the Korean team at the 2009 Mount Titlis World Women's Curling Championship that finished 10th. She played just one match in that game, a losing cause to Germany.

As a skip, Kim won the silver medal on 2010 Pacific Curling Championships for Korea. Her Korean team was defeated by the former World Champion Chinese team, skipped by Wang Bingyu, in the final. Later in the season, she led her Korean team to a bronze medal at the 2011 Winter Universiade.

As the reigning Pacific champion, Kim would play in her second World championships at the 2011 Capital One World Women's Curling Championship. At the 2012 Ford World Women's Curling Championship, South Korea made history by winning the most games ever in history and made the playoffs for the first time. They eliminated Canada to advance to the semifinal, but lost a close game against eventual champions Switzerland. They then lost another close game to the Canadians in the bronze medal game, finishing in fourth place. Their fourth-place finish ensured them a spot in the 2014 Winter Olympics, even though South Korea did not qualify for the 2013 World Championships. At the Olympics, she led her Korean team to an 8th-place finish and a 3–6 record.

Coaching
In 2017, Kim Ji-sun (who speaks fluent Chinese) took up the position of the coach of Shanghai junior team two months after her retirement. In January 2019, she was promoted to the head coach position of the Shanghai team and tasked with overseeing its senior, junior, and youth squads.

Personal life
When she was young, Kim was a speed skater. Kim met Chinese curler Xu Xiaoming in China in 2007 and married him in 2013. She has one son, Su-ho.

Teammates

Grand Slam record

References

External links

1987 births
Living people
South Korean female curlers
Curlers at the 2014 Winter Olympics
Olympic curlers of South Korea
Sportspeople from Gyeonggi Province
Curlers from Seoul
Universiade medalists in curling
Pacific-Asian curling champions
Universiade silver medalists for South Korea
Universiade bronze medalists for South Korea
Competitors at the 2011 Winter Universiade
Competitors at the 2013 Winter Universiade
South Korean expatriate sportspeople in China